The following is a summary of Down county football team's 2013 season.

Kits
McKenna Cup and National League kits

Championship kits

Competitions

Dr McKenna Cup

Down made a strong start to their 2013 campaign with McKenna Cup group victories over Cavan and neighbouring county Armagh. Queen's University withdrew from the competition over a row regarding player availability and the fixture was simply written off. Down progressed into the latter stages of the McKenna Cup but fell short, against Monaghan, of a place in the final.

Fixtures

Queen's withdraw from the McKenna Cup over a player availability dispute.

Table

Results

National Football League Division 1

Down looked deserving relegation favourites in the National Football League Division 1, as they lost their first three games, two of which were at home. Down looked close to beating Cork at home but fell to a very late goal. A comeback looked on the cards as Down went out and beat Mayo at Páirc Esler; however, defeats to Kerry and Dublin sealed Down's fate and relegation was a certainty despite an impressive 3–13 to 1-12 hammering of Kildare in Newry.

Fixtures

Table

Results

Ulster Senior Football Championship

Fixtures
The draw for the 2013 Ulster Senior Football Championship took place on 4 October 2012.

Having got to the 2012 Ulster final, Down started their Cup run away to Derry at Celtic Park. In what was regarded as one of the games of the summer, Down came out victors having been five points down at half-time. The semi-final paired last year's finalists again in what would be a closely fought affair. Donegal maintained a two-point lead throughout the match and eventually won 12 points to 9.

Rounds

Results

All-Ireland Senior Football Championship

Down entered the 2013 All-Ireland Senior Football Championship in the round 2 qualifier stage. The draw for the second round took place on Monday 1 July 2013 and once again had Down travelling to Celtic Park, Derry. Down produced a poor display in this repeat fixture as they failed to score from open play in the entire second half and lost the game by five points.

Fixtures

Results

O'Fiaich Cup
On 27 November 2013, it was announced that the O'Fiaich Cup would return for the first time since the late 1990s.

Fixtures

Table

References

Down
Gaelic
Down county football team seasons